Balta hebardi is a species of cockroach, found in Western Australia. The specific epithet honors the entomologist Morgan Hebard.

References

Cockroaches
Insects of Australia
Insects described in 1969